Lawrence J. Raphael (born) is a professor in the Communications Sciences and Disorders department at Adelphi University in New York City, New York.  Recently, he has become known for his cluttering research, although he has a more extensive publication record in speech production and perception. He was a research associate at Haskins Laboratories from 1970 to 1999.

Raphael's research appears in several journals including the Journal of the Acoustical Society of America. Raphael is a Fellow of the New York Academy of Sciences and is a Professor Emeritus of The Graduate Center and of Lehman College of The City University of New York in their Speech Science department.

He has collaborated with Kenneth St. Louis, Florence Myers, and Klaas Bakker in recent research on cluttering.

Bibliography

References

Adelphi University faculty
Living people
American acoustical engineers
Speech production researchers
American non-fiction writers
Year of birth missing (living people)